Glee: The Music, Volume 5 is the sixth soundtrack album by the cast of the musical television series Glee. Released on March 8, 2011, by Columbia Records, it was produced executively by Dante Di Loreto and Brad Falchuk. In addition to 14 cover versions from its second season, the album contains two of the series' first original songs. The first of these, "Get It Right", was composed specifically for cast member Lea Michele, and the other, "Loser like Me", is a group number written with the Swedish songwriter Max Martin. All of its tracks have been released as singles, and have managed to place on several national record charts.

Background
The album features music starting from Glee post-Super Bowl episode. American actress Gwyneth Paltrow, who made an appearance in an earlier episode covering Cee Lo Green's "Forget You!", returns for three additional songs. Glee: The Music, Volume 5, announced in a press release on February 22, 2011, features the series' first original songs. "Loser like Me" is performed by the main glee club New Directions, with Lea Michele and Cory Monteith, as Rachel Berry and Finn Hudson, on lead vocals. Described by Glee music supervisor Adam Anders as "a very uptempo, kind-of-summery hit", the song was co-written with Swedish music songwriter and producer Max Martin, known for his work with many pop artists. Having covered many of Martin's co-written songs on the series, including songs by Britney Spears and Kelly Clarkson, Anders felt it was appropriate to have his involvement. According to the American Society of Composers, Authors and Publishers database, co-writers on the song include Anders, Peer Åström, Savan Kotecha, and Johan Schuster. The second song, "Get It Right", is a ballad specifically inspired by and composed for Michele by Anders, his writing partner, and his wife. Both songs premiered on Ryan Seacrest's radio program on February 25, 2011, and were performed in the episode "Original Song", on March 15, 2011. "Loser like Me" also saw a radio release date—March 1, 2011 for pop and adult pop stations.

Reception

Allmusic's Andrew Leahey gave the album a rating of two-and-a-half stars out of five, praising the first track, "Thriller / Heads Will Roll", as well as Paltrow's appearances. However, he found monotony in Glee conventional mix of popular music and show tunes, even with the two original tracks. Rolling Stone Jody Rosen gave "Loser like Me" a four-star rating out of five, and felt its message related well to the show's theme. While initial sales projections were set at 75,000 copies, Glee: The Music, Volume 5 sold 90,000 copies in the US, debuting at number three on the Billboard 200. The album debuted on the New Zealand Albums Chart at number thirty-five and climbed to number three the next week. On the Australian Albums Chart, Volume 5 debuted at number one, becoming the second album by the cast to reach the top spot, following Glee: The Music, Volume 3 Showstoppers. In Canada, the album debuted at #3 on the Canadian Albums Chart, selling 5,700 copies in its second week of release. The album debuted in Ireland on April 14, 2011 at number five.

Singles

All songs from the album have been released as singles, available for digital download. "Thriller / Heads Will Roll" has charted highest in Australia, at number 17, while the Glee Cast original "Loser like Me" charted highest in the United States and Canada, at number 6 and 9, respectively. Two tracks on the album have charted higher on the Billboard Hot 100 than the original versions. The cast's cover of My Chemical Romance's "Sing" charted at number 49 while the original reached number 58, and "Take Me or Leave Me" from the musical Rent charted at number 51 while the version from its 2005 film adaptation failed to chart on the Hot 100, bubbling instead at number 25.

Track listing
Unless otherwise indicated, Information is based on Liner Notes

Personnel
Unless otherwise indicated, Information is based on Liner Notes

Dianna Agron – vocals (Credit only)
Adam Anders – musical arrangement, engineer, music producer, vocal producer, soundtrack producer, digital editing, vocal arrangement, additional background vocals (All tracks)
Alex Anders – digital editing, engineer, additional vocal producer, additional background vocals 
Nikki Anders – additional vocal arrangement, additional background vocals
Rod Argent – composer
Peer Åström – musical arrangement, music producer, vocal producer, engineer, mixing (All tracks)
Kala Balch – additional background vocals
Dave Bett – art direction
PJ Bloom – music supervisor
Ravaughn Brown – additional background vocals
Geoff Bywater – executive in charge of music
Deyder Cintron – assistant engineer, digital editing
Chris Colfer – vocals (Credit only)
Kamari Copeland – additional background vocals
Darren Criss – lead vocals (11)
Tim Davis – vocal contractor, additional vocal arrangement, additional background vocals
Dante Di Loreto – soundtrack executive producer
Brad Falchuk – soundtrack executive producer
Chris Feldman – art direction
Serban Ghenea – mixing
Heather Guibert – coordination
Missi Hale – additional background vocals
Jon Hall – additional background vocals
Fredrik Jansson – assistant engineer

Tobias Kampe-Flygare – assistant engineer
Storm Lee – additional background vocals
David Loucks – additional background vocals
Jane Lynch – vocals (Credit only)
Meaghan Lyons – coordination
Dominick Maita – mastering
Chris Mann – additional background vocals
Max Martin – music producer, vocal producer (16)
Jayma Mays – vocals (Credit only)
Kevin McHale – lead vocals (1, 3, 5, 7-8, 12)
Lea Michele – lead vocals (1-2, 6, 9-11, 15-16)
Cory Monteith – lead vocals (1, 3, 10, 16)
Heather Morris – lead vocals (14, 16)
Matthew Morrison – lead vocals (13)
Ryan Murphy – music producer, vocal producer (All tracks), soundtrack producer
Chord Overstreet – lead vocals (3, 7-8, 16)
Gwyneth Paltrow - lead vocals (12-14)
Ryan Petersen – assistant engineer
Nicole Ray – coordination
Amber Riley – lead vocals (1, 9, 12, 16)
Naya Rivera – lead vocals (1, 14, 16)
Mark Salling – lead vocals (2, 4, 16)
Harry Shum Jr. - lead vocals (16)
Drew Ryan Scott – additional background vocals
Onitsha Shaw – additional background vocals
Shellback – music producer, vocal producer (16)
Jenny Sinclair – coordination
Jenna Ushkowitz – vocals (Credit only)
Windy Wagner – additional background vocals
Joe Wohlmuth – assistant engineer

Charts and certifications

Weekly charts

Year-end charts

Certifications

Release history

References

External links
Glee: The Music, Volume 5 at Allmusic

2011 soundtrack albums
Columbia Records soundtracks
Glee (TV series) albums